"Cool Change" is a song by Australian rock group Little River Band written by lead singer Glenn Shorrock. It was released in August 1979 the second single from their sixth album, First Under the Wire. The song peaked at number 10 on the Billboard Hot 100 the week of 19 January 1980.

The song was not released as a single in Australia. However, in May 2001, "Cool Change" was selected by the Australasian Performing Right Association (APRA) as one of the Top 30 Australian songs of all time. The song was also awarded a special citation of achievement by BMI for over two million radio broadcasts in the United States.

In January 2018, as part of Triple M's "Ozzest 100", the 'most Australian' songs of all time, "Cool Change" was ranked number 89.

Track listings
 New Zealand 7" (Capitol Records – F4789)
A. "Cool Change" - 3:56	
B. "Middle Man" - 4:24

 North American 7" (Capitol 4789)
A. "Cool Change" - 3:56	
B. "Middle Man" - 4:24

Personnel
Little River Band members
Beeb Birtles – guitar, backing vocals (track 1), lead vocals (track 2)
Mike Clarke – bass guitar
Derek Pellicci – drums, percussion
Glenn Shorrock – lead vocals (track 1), backing vocals (track 2)
Graeham Goble – guitar, backing vocals

Additional musicians
Bill Harrower – saxophone
Peter Jones – piano (track 1), keyboards (track 2)

Production details
Producer – John Boylan, Little River Band

Charts

Weekly charts

Year-end Charts

Cover versions
 Greg London released a cover to radio on 16 June 2009 that entered the top 30 on the Media Base and R&R airplay charts on 18 August 2009, reaching number 5 on the FMQB AC40 Chart.
 Filipina singer Jaya did a cover of this song in 2007 from the album of the same title.

References

1979 singles
APRA Award winners
Little River Band songs
Songs written by Glenn Shorrock
1979 songs
Capitol Records singles